The Dresden Basin ( or Dresdner Elbtalweitung) is a roughly 45 km long and 10 km wide area of the Elbe Valley between the towns of Pirna and Meißen. The city of Dresden lies in the Dresden Basin.

Geography 
 

The Dresden Basin is formed by the foothills and flanks of the Eastern Ore Mountains and western Lusatian Highlands and the northwestern slopes of Saxon Switzerland. Geologically it is a rift valley and its most important river, the Elbe flows through it in wide meanders. The region is climatically milder than the surrounding area, so that on the northern slopes of the hills vineyards may be cultivated (Saxon Wine Route). In addition, there is intensive fruit farming. The valley climate is significantly drier (average annual precipitation below 700 mm) and warmer (average air temperature 8.5 °C, in Dresden city centre 9.9 °C) than the surrounding hills. The region was settled early due to the fertile soils (loess) and the easy river crossings and achieved worldwide importance from a cultural and historical perspective. Today the Dresden conurbation almost entirely fills the basin.

Parts of the Dresden Basin near the Elbe (the Dresden Elbe Valley) were given World Heritage Site status between 2004 and 2009 by UNESCO due to their cultural and natural significance.

During the East German era, the Basin was jokingly referred to by its inhabitants as the Valley of the Clueless, because they were not able to receive West German television until the late 1980s, and then only patchily.

The most important towns and cities are (in downstream order):
 Pirna
 Heidenau
 Dresden
 Radebeul
 Coswig (Sachsen)
 Meißen

References

Bibliography 
Dickinson, Robert E (1964). Germany: A regional and economic geography (2nd ed.). London: Methuen. .
 Elkins, T H (1972). Germany (3rd ed.). London: Chatto & Windus, 1972. .

See also 
 List of regions of Saxony
 Natural regions of Germany
 Saxony, meander

Natural regions of Saxony
Valleys of Saxony